Haddington Burghs was a Scottish district of burghs constituency of the House of Commons of Great Britain (at Westminster) from 1708 to 1801 and of the House of Commons of the United Kingdom (also at Westminster) from 1801 until 1885.  It elected one Member of Parliament (MP) using the first-past-the-post voting system.

Creation
The British parliamentary constituency was created in 1708 following the Acts of Union, 1707 and replaced the former Parliament of Scotland burgh constituencies of Haddington, Dunbar,  Jedburgh,  Lauder and North Berwick

Boundaries 

The constituency consisted of the Haddingtonshire burghs of Haddington, Dunbar, and North Berwick, the Berwickshire burgh of Lauder, and the Roxburghshire burgh of Jedburgh.

History
The constituency elected one Member of Parliament (MP) by the first past the post system until the seat was abolished for the 1885 general election.

In 1885, Haddington, Dunbar, and North Berwick were merged into the county constituency of Haddingtonshire, Lauder was merged into the county constituency of Berwickshire, and Jedburgh was merged into the county constituency of Roxburghshire.

Members of Parliament

Election results

Elections in the 1830s

 On petition, Steuart was unseated in favour of Dalrymple

Steuart was appointed as a Lord Commissioner of the Treasury, requiring a by-election.

Elections in the 1840s

Elections in the 1850s

Elections in the 1860s

Elections in the 1870s

Davie resigned, causing a by-election.

Hay succeeded to the peerage, becoming the 10th Marquess of Tweeddale.

Elections in the 1880s

Wedderburn resigned, causing a by-election.

References

Historic parliamentary constituencies in Scotland (Westminster)
Politics of East Lothian
Constituencies of the Parliament of the United Kingdom established in 1708
Constituencies of the Parliament of the United Kingdom disestablished in 1885